Montana PBS is the PBS member public television network for the U.S. state of Montana. It is a joint venture between Montana State University (MSU) and the University of Montana (UM). The network is headquartered in the Visual Communications Building on the MSU campus in Bozeman, with a separate studio on the UM campus in Missoula.

The network comprises six stations — flagship KUSM-TV (channel 9) in Bozeman and full-power satellites KUFM-TV (channel 11) in Missoula, KBGS-TV (channel 16) in Billings, KUHM-TV (channel 10) in Helena, KUGF-TV (channel 21) in Great Falls and KUKL-TV (channel 46) in Kalispell — and a network of 60 low-power repeaters in Montana. KUSM and KUHM are licensed to MSU, KUFM to UM, and KBGS, KUGF and KUKL to The Board of Regents of the Montana University System.

History
In 1983, several Gallatin Valley residents led by Nancy Fikkema formed Montanans for Children's Television (MCT) to press for a PBS station in the area. They wanted to give the few residents without access to cable a way to watch public television, especially PBS children's programming.  At the time, Montana viewers had to rely on cable or translators for PBS programming.  Depending on the location, cable systems in western Montana piped in KSPS-TV in Spokane or KRMA-TV in Denver, while cable systems in eastern and central Montana piped in Prairie Public Television from North Dakota or KUED in Salt Lake City. KRMA–now known as Rocky Mountain PBS–and KSPS still operate translators in Montana. Additionally, some commercial stations in Montana, including KTVQ in Billings and KFBB in Great Falls, carried Sesame Street and may have carried other PBS programs.

The University of Utah, owner of KUED, was willing to bring a KUED satellite station to Bozeman if there was enough local support. However, the only viable facilities for such a station were at MSU, and school officials balked at using educational funds for public benefit. With this in mind, MCT published a survey in the Bozeman Chronicle asking if at least 2,000 people were willing to contribute $2 per month for a local public television station. After the survey found there was sufficient public support, KUSM signed on for the first time on October 1, 1984. The transmitter was donated by Montana broadcasting pioneer Joe Sample. MSU didn't have enough funding at the time to support a public television station, and the Gallatin Valley didn't have nearly enough people at the time for viewer-supported public television. Station engineers switched to and from KUED's signal for most PBS programming until 1987, giving MSU time to train its staff and build local financial support. With KUSM's debut, Montana became the last state with an educational station within its borders, 14 years after Mississippi became the last state east of the Mississippi River with its own PBS station. 

In 1987, KUSM became a full member of PBS. In 1988, KUSM was added to TCI's cable systems in the eastern two-thirds of Montana, from Butte eastward. KUED had been carried on TCI and its various predecessors since 1965. TCI began phasing out KUED on its systems in the summer of 1988, with KUSM completely replacing KUED in that part of the state by 1990.

Early on, UM partnered with MSU to extend KUSM's reach to western Montana. By 1991, KUSM began branding as Montana Public Television, reflecting its new statewide reach.

UM had won a construction permit for KUFM-TV in 1992. The station signed on for the first time in 1996, and the two stations began broadcasting as a network on New Year's Day 1997. In 1999, the network rebranded as Montana PBS.

Montana PBS's third full-powered station, KBGS-TV in Billings, signed on in late 2009. The fourth full-powered satellite, KUGF in Great Falls, signed on in fall 2010. KUKL-TV in Kalispell followed in 2011.

The network has expanded rather slowly, relying on cable and satellite coverage for most of its viewership. This didn't pose as much of a problem as it may seem at first glance due to a partnership with the state's cable systems. Even in the digital era, cable and satellite are all but essential for acceptable television in most of Montana.

On July 1, 2015, Gray Television announced that it would donate the license assets of Helena CW affiliate KMTF to Montana State University for integration into the Montana PBS system as its sixth full-power station (the station's CW Plus programming will continue to be carried on a subchannel of NBC affiliate KTVH, which Gray sold to Cordillera Communications in correlation to the deal). The station, re-called KUHM-TV, will improve reception in areas around Helena unable to receive that city's local translator, K49EH-D.

Programming
Most of the local programs such as Backroads of Montana, 11th and Grant, and Montana Ag Live, as well as Montana historical documentaries and current event programs, are created by independent producers for Montana PBS. Due to a strong program for journalism and radio/television at UM and for documentary filmmaking at MSU, many of the network's local programs are produced by students.

Some of the Montana-made programming is also available online.

Stations
The six full-service television licenses comprising Montana PBS include:

Notes:

Translators 
Montana PBS is additionally rebroadcast over a network of nine low-power digital translator stations, operating one of the largest translator networks in the state of Montana. MSU acquired the West Glacier transmitter from Canyon TV in 2014 for the nominal purchase price of one dollar. In 2018, it acquired the five translators led by KSKC-CD (now K27MS-D), the public television station of Salish Kootenai College, and incorporated them into the network. Not owned by the network are additional translators run by TV districts.

The following translators rebroadcast KBGS-TV:
 Billings: K20HB-D
 Bridger: K26NN-D

The following translators rebroadcast KUFM-TV:
 Arlee: K17NE-D
 Drummond: K22MI-D
 Ferndale: K33OH-D
 Heron: K13ZN-D
 Hot Springs: K29ND-D
 Pablo/Ronan: KSKC-CD
 Philipsburg: K15KW-D
 Plains: K08OY-D
 Plains: K21CA-D
 Plains: K34PQ-D
 St. Ignatius: K33OR-D
 Thompson Falls: K23NP-D
 Townsend: K11WM-D

The following translators rebroadcast KUGF-TV:
 Big Sandy: K13OQ-D
 Loma: K29LD-D

The following translators rebroadcast KUKL-TV:
 Kalispell: KEXI-LD
 West Glacier: K12LU-D

The following translators rebroadcast KUSM-TV:
 Belgrade, etc.: K17KB-D
 Boulder: K27CD-D
 Boulder: K36CX-D
 Butte: K24MP-D
 Chinook: K22LD-D
 Circle, etc.: K18CR-D
 Conrad: K16KB-D
 Ekalaka: K23DJ-D
 Emigrant: K27LO-D
 Helena: K33OP-D
 Joplin: K35OF-D
 Livingston: K48NS-D
 Plevna: K34DP-D

Network map

Technical information

Subchannels 
The digital signals of Montana PBS' stations are multiplexed:

Analog-to-digital conversion
Montana PBS' stations shut down their analog signals on June 12, 2009, the official date in which full-power television station's in the United States transitioned from analog to digital broadcasts under federal mandate. The station's digital channel allocations post-transition are as follows:
 KUSM-TV shut down its analog signal, over VHF channel 9; the station's digital signal remained on its pre-transition VHF channel 8. Through the use of PSIP, digital television receivers display the station's virtual channel as its former VHF analog channel 9.
 KUFM-TV shut down its analog signal, over VHF channel 11; the station's digital signal relocated from its pre-transition UHF channel 27 to VHF channel 11.

Satellite 
Montana PBS is available free-to-air on AMC 21 (125°W) Ku-band satellite television.

References

External links
Official website

PBS member networks
Broadcast media of the University of Montana
Montana State University
Television stations in Montana
1984 establishments in Montana
Television channels and stations established in 1984